Shuklaphanta is a municipality in Kanchanpur District in Sudurpashchim Province of south-western Nepal. The new municipality was formed by merging two existing villages—Jhalari and Pipaladi—on 18 May 2014. The office of the municipality is that of the former Jhalari village development committee.

Population
At the time of the 2011 Nepal census, Jhalari and Pipaladi had a population of 24,347 and 17,679 people living in 4,782 and 3,243 individual households respectively. Now it had a total population of 42,026 people living in 8,025 individual households.

References

External links
District Development Committee, Kanchanpur

See also

Populated places in Kanchanpur District
Nepal municipalities established in 2014
Municipalities in Kanchanpur District